Franklin Marquieth Robinson (born June 1, 1984) is an American professional basketball retired player. He played college basketball for the East Carolina University and the California State University, Fullerton.

Professional career
Robinson started his professional career in 2008 with Union Olimpija of Slovenia. On February 27, 2009, he parted ways with Olimpija. In March 2009, he signed with Ludwigsburg for the rest of the season.

On December 23, 2009, Robinson was acquired by the Los Angeles D-Fenders of the NBA D-League.

On July 24, 2010, Robinson signed with Maccabi Haifa of Israel for the 2010–11 season.

The 2011–12 season Robinson started with Sukhumi, but left the team after few weeks due to the financial problems the club was facing. He then signed with Artland Dragons but left the team before appearing in a game for them. In December 2011, he moved to Israel and signed with Habik'a for the rest of the 2011–12 season.

On September 7, 2012, Robinson signed with Asseco Prokom Gdynia of Poland. On November 28, 2012, he parted ways with Prokom. On December 5, 2012, he signed with Budivelnyk of Ukraine. On January 30, 2013, he was waived by Budivelnyk. On February 23, 2013, he signed with S.Oliver Baskets of Germany for the rest of the season.

On October 3, 2013, Robinson signed with Bisons Loimaa of Finland for the 2013–14 season.

On September 17, 2014, Robinson signed with Panelefsiniakos of Greece. On December 31, 2014, he left Panelefsiniakos and signed with Israeli club Ironi Nahariya for the rest of the season.

On February 12, 2016, Robinson signed with İstanbul DSİ of the Turkish Basketball First League. In six games, he averaged 15.7 points, 4.5 rebounds and 3.2 assists per game.

On July 29, 2016, Robinson signed with Serbian club Partizan for the 2016–17 season. On May 7, 2017, he parted ways with Partizan.

On September 8, 2017, Robinson signed with Club Malvín for the 2017–18 season. He left Malvin after appearing in 17 games. On January 30, 2018, he signed with Changwon LG Sakers of South Korea for the rest of the season.

Robinson announced the end of his career in October 2018.

The Basketball Tournament
Frank Robinson played for Team CitiTeam Blazers in the 2018 edition of The Basketball Tournament. In two games, he averaged 5.5 points per game and 4.0 rebounds per game. CitiTeam Blazers made it to the Second Round before falling to Team Challenge ALS.

Career statistics

Euroleague

|-
| style="text-align:left;"| 2008–09
| style="text-align:left;"| Union Olimpija
| 8 || 5 || 20.2 || .588 || .143 || .579 || 3.3 || .6 || .5 || .0 || 6.8 || 4.4
|-
| style="text-align:left;"| 2012–13
| style="text-align:left;"| Asseco Prokom Gdynia
| 7 || 4 || 20.2 || .407 || .269 || .50 || 3.7 || .6 || .6 || .0 || 7.4 || 5.9
|- class="sortbottom"
| style="text-align:left;"| Career
| style="text-align:left;"|
| 15 || 9 || 20.2 || .382 || .242 || .541 || 3.5 || .6 || .5 || .0 || 7.1 || 5.1

References

External links
EuroLeague profile
RealGM profile
Cal State Fullerton Titans bio
 

1984 births
Living people
ABA League players
African-American basketball players
American expatriate basketball people in Finland
American expatriate basketball people in Georgia (country)
American expatriate basketball people in Germany
American expatriate basketball people in Greece
American expatriate basketball people in Israel
American expatriate basketball people in Poland
American expatriate basketball people in Serbia
American expatriate basketball people in Slovenia
American expatriate basketball people in South Korea
American expatriate basketball people in Turkey
American expatriate basketball people in Ukraine
American expatriate basketball people in Uruguay
American men's basketball players
Asseco Gdynia players
Basketball players from Compton, California
BC Budivelnyk players
Big3 players
Bisons Loimaa players
Cal State Fullerton Titans men's basketball players
Changwon LG Sakers players
Club Malvín basketball players
East Carolina Pirates men's basketball players
Ironi Nahariya players
KK Partizan players
KK Olimpija players
Los Angeles D-Fenders players
Maccabi Haifa B.C. players
Riesen Ludwigsburg players
Panelefsiniakos B.C. players
S.Oliver Würzburg players
Shooting guards
Small forwards
21st-century African-American sportspeople
20th-century African-American people
American men's 3x3 basketball players